Are You Carrying Any Gold Or Living Relatives: Through The Soviet Union with Nila is a book by Irene Kampen about her travels in the Soviet Union in the summer of 1969. In the book Kampen visits the Soviet Union with her friend and translator Nila Magidoff.

American travel books
1970 non-fiction books
Books about the Soviet Union